Bedside Manner is a 1945 American film directed by Andrew L. Stone, based on a 1944 Saturday Evening Post story of the same name by Robert Carson.  The film was re-released in 1950 under the title Her Favorite Patient.

Plot summary 

Plastic surgeon Dr. Hedy Fredericks (Ruth Hussey) picks up three hitchhiking Marines, Tommy (Joel McGinnis), Dick (John James), and Harry (Frank Jenks) (who all have Smith as their last name), while driving home to Chicago. On the way she makes a quick stop in her birth town of Blithewood, and is appalled by the way the town has changed since she left it years ago. The whole town now has a large defense plant with the population having grown dramatically.

Hedy runs into a man she believes is her childhood friend Smedley Hoover during her short visit, but it is in fact a test pilot named Morgan Hale (John Carroll). Her meeting with Morgan makes his date, Lola Cross (Ann Rutherford) so jealous that she stands him up. 
 
Hedy also meets with her uncle, Dr. J.H ”Doc” Fredericks (Charles Ruggles), who in vain tries to persuade her into staying and sharing his practice. She also visits another childhood friend named Stella Livingston (Renee Godfrey), who is in need of plastic surgery after an accident at the defense plant.  Hedy performs the surgery on her friend’s face, and then she goes out to the local hang-out with the three Smiths later in the night. There they meet Morgan, Lola, and a beautiful Russian pilot named Tanya (Claudia Drake). A series of complications occurs, leading to Morgan pursuing Tanya and Lola going out with Harry Smith. 
 
Morgan is still angry at Hedy for breaking up his date earlier, but they make up after he crashes his plane during a test flight and Hedy is the one to treat him afterwards. The next day though, Hedy heads for Chicago after taking Morgan’s stitches out, much to his disappointment. Desperate to get Hedy to stay, Morgan chases her in his car, but crashes again, leading to Hedy having to treat him again. The next day, Morgan has another condition in need of treatment, and Hedy continues treating him. She spends a lot of time with Morgan, but doesn’t realize her feelings for him until Morgan stays out all night with Lola, and she gets jealous. Her uncle reveals that he and Morgan have been in on a plan to get her to stay in town. Furious, Hedy starts treating Morgan with a series of very unpleasant and rough sine cures, trying to make him expose himself as a fraud. Then she tries to leave for Chicago one more time, but slips on an ice cube from one of her rough treatments and is knocked unconscious. When she wakes up, she confesses her love for Morgan and they have their first kiss.

Cast 

John Carroll as Morgan Hale
Ruth Hussey as Dr. Hedy Fredericks, MD
Charles Ruggles as Dr. J.H. "Doc" Fredericks
Ann Rutherford as Lola Cross
Esther Dale as Martha Gravitt
Grant Mitchell as Mr. Pope
Frank Jenks as Pvt. Harry Smith
Vera Marshe as Mrs. Mary Hastings
Claudia Drake as Tanya Punchinskaya
Renee Godfrey as Stella Livingston
Joel McGinnis as Pvt Tommy Smith
John James as Pfc. Dick Smith
Bert Roach as George Hastings

External links

References

1945 films
1945 comedy films
American comedy films
American black-and-white films
Films based on short fiction
Films directed by Andrew L. Stone
United Artists films
1940s English-language films
1940s American films